Slaven Čupković (born June 23, 1988) is a Serbian professional basketball player who last played for Sloga of the Serbian Basketball League of Serbia (KLS). He is 2.07 m (6 ft 9  in) tall.

Professional career
On August 19, 2014, Čupković joined Aries Trikala, signing a one-year deal with the club. Čupković signed to play in Greece, with Aris of the Greek Basket League and EuroCup, in 2015. On July 1, 2016, he joined the newly promoted club to the Greek Basket League Kymis.

In July 2019, Čupković signed for Alba Fehérvár of the Hungarian League.

National team career
Čupković was a member of the junior national teams of Serbia. With Serbia's Under-19 national team, he won the gold medal at the 2007 FIBA Under-19 World Cup.

References

External links
EuroCup Profile
FIBA Profile
Eurobasket.com Profile
Greek Basket League Profile 

1988 births
Living people
Alba Fehérvár players
Aries Trikala B.C. players
Aris B.C. players
KK Napredak Kruševac players
KK Mašinac players
KK Sloga players
Kolossos Rodou B.C. players
Kymis B.C. players
Panionios B.C. players
Power forwards (basketball)
Rosa Radom players
Serbian men's basketball players
Serbian expatriate basketball people in Greece
Serbian expatriate basketball people in Hungary
Serbian expatriate basketball people in North Macedonia
Serbian expatriate basketball people in Poland